Royal N. "Hunky" Shaw (September 29, 1884 – July 3, 1969) was a Major League Baseball pinch-hitter. In 1 career game, he had 0 hits in 1 at-bat. He batted and threw right-handed.

Shaw was born and died in Yakima, Washington.  He attended the University of Washington, where he played college baseball for the Huskies in 1905.

References

External links
Baseball Reference.com page

1884 births
1969 deaths
Pittsburgh Pirates players
Washington Huskies baseball players
Minor league baseball managers
Portland Browns players
Tacoma Tigers players
Jersey City Skeeters players
Worcester Busters players
Providence Grays (minor league) players
San Francisco Seals (baseball) players
Seattle Giants players
Spokane Indians players
Vancouver Beavers players
Roseburg Shamrocks players